The 10.5 cm schwere Kanone 18/40 was a field gun used by Germany in World War II.  The 18/40 arose from an O.K.H request to produce a variant of the 10.5 cm schwere Kanone 18 with greater range.  Both Krupp and Rheinmetal produced similar, but competing designs.  Production was proposed in 1941, but delayed until 1943 because it was felt its introduction would disrupt existing production schedules.  When it did go into production it was designated as the 10.5 cm schwere Kanone 18/42.  The main difference between the schwere Kanone 18 and schwere Kanone 18/42 were a longer barrel and the same carriage as the 15 cm sFH 18/40.

References 

World War II artillery of Germany
105 mm artillery
Krupp
Rheinmetall
Weapons and ammunition introduced in 1943